LiveTiles is an intranet and digital workplace software company founded in 2014. The company develops cloud-based digital workplace software for the commercial, government and education markets.

The company is headquartered in Melbourne, and has offices in New York City, Rochester, Tri-Cities (Washington State), Basel, Zurich, Bern, Romania, Sligo, Copenhagen, Denmark, Sydney, Geelong, Brisbane, and Hobart.

History
LiveTiles was founded in Australia in 2014, and in 2015 it became listed on the Australian Securities Exchange after its reverse acquisition of coal company Modun Resources Limited, with an initial IPO of A$57 million. The CEO of the company is Karl Redenbach, who cofounded LiveTiles with Peter Nguyen-Brown. In 2017, the company raised A$12 million in equity financing through a share purchase plan.

In May 2018, LiveTiles acquired US based Microsoft AI firm Hyperfish for A$8.9 million.

In February 2019, LiveTiles acquired Danish digital workplace software company Wizdom for a maximum total purchase price of EUR 30 million (approximately A$47.6 million).

In November 2019, LiveTiles acquired Swiss intranet provider CYCL AG in a deal worth A$19 million, which was made up of A$6.3 million in cash and A$12.6 million in shares.

In December 2021, LiveTiles acquired Portuguese software specialist BindTuning in a deal worth A$10 million as part of a two-year deal.

Corporate affairs

Leadership 
LiveTiles is managed by CEO and Co-Founder Karl Redenbach. Other key executives are:

 Peter Nguyen-Brown, Chief Experience Officer & Co-Founder
 Vanessa Ferguson, SVP People and Experience

Products / business model 
The company develops and sells cloud-based digital workplace and intranet's for Office 365, Azure, and SharePoint. This includes various solutions including LiveTiles Mosaic, which was developed for K-12 educational institutions and has 1.2 million users, and LiveTiles Commercial. They also provide LiveTiles Reach, a mobile app; digital workplace and intranet design tools called LiveTiles Intranet and LiveTiles Everywhere; artificial intelligence, employee wellness and communication platform LiveTiles Quantum.

In 2017, LiveTiles partnered with Microsoft to launch the joint venture AI Australia, an Australian-based artificial intelligence development firm.

Awards 
LiveTiles has won business and technology awards for its AI and IT work. In 2018 the company was presented with Microsoft’s "US Modern Workplace Transformation Partner of the Year" award, recognizing its advancements in workplace integration of AI. Also in 2018, LiveTiles won “Best Application of AI in the Enterprise” at the AIconics AI Summit.

References

External links
 

2014 establishments in the United States
Cloud computing providers
Companies listed on the Australian Securities Exchange
Companies based in New York City